Busca may refer to:

People
 Antonio Busca (lieutenant) (1767–1834), Italian nobleman and lieutenant
 Antonio Busca (painter) (1625–1686), Italian painter
 Gianmarco Busca (born 1965), Italian catholic bishop
 Ignazio Busca (1731–1803), Italian cardinal
 Pasquale Busca (born 1948), Italian racewalker

Places
 Busca, Piedmont, Italy
 Bușca, Mihăești, Olt, Romania

Other
 busca is the Spanish and Portuguese word for "he/she/it searches"